is a Japanese actress, voice actress, singer, and model affiliated with Amuse. She is best known for voicing Nana Daiba in Revue Starlight, Shioriko Mifune in Love Live! Nijigasaki High School Idol Club, and Sasago Jennifer Yuka in D4DJ.

Biography
Moeka was born into a musical family, with both of her parents and grandfather having music-related jobs. She also has an older sister who works as a model in Osaka, whose stage name is Licca. 

She is described as a shy and modest, but sometimes playful person who is rather independent. She says that she relates to her character, Nana, in that she is always preoccupied with her cast-mates' well being.

Along with costar Haruki Iwata, Moeka is part of the musical unit "harmoe".

Filmography

Anime
Revue Starlight as Nana Daiba 
D4DJ: First Mix as Sasago Jennifer Yuka 
Love Live! Nijigasaki High School Idol Club as Shioriko Mifune 
Odd Taxi as Shiho Ichimura
I Shall Survive Using Potions! as Emile

Video games
Revue Starlight Re:Live as Nana Daiba 
D4DJ as Sasago Jennifer Yuka 
Love Live! Nijigasaki High School Idol Club as Shioriko Mifune 
Towa Tsugai as Fukurou

References 

1996 births
Living people
Amuse Inc. talents
Anime singers
Japanese women pop singers
Japanese idols
Japanese television actresses
Japanese video game actresses
Japanese voice actresses
Musicians from Osaka Prefecture
Nijigasaki High School Idol Club members
Voice actresses from Osaka Prefecture
21st-century Japanese actresses
21st-century Japanese women singers
21st-century Japanese singers